Jarkhi is a village and former princely state in Uttar Pradesh. It was the capital of 41 villages.

Demographics
As of 2011 India census, Jarkhi had a population of 1,468. Males constitute 53.3% of the population and females 46.7%. Jarkhi has an average literacy rate of 64.55%, higher than the national average of 59.5%: male literacy is 76.95%, and female literacy is 49.38%. In Jarkhi, 14.1% of the population is under 6 years of age.

References

Villages in Firozabad district